Tanja Malti Jadnanansing (born 26 April 1967) is a Dutch politician and former television presenter and communication employee. As a member of the Labour Party (Partij van de Arbeid), she was an MP from 17 June 2010 to 7 September 2016. She was replaced by Amma Asante. Jadnanansing focused on matters of higher education and science policy.

Jadnanansing studied law at VU University Amsterdam.

Tanja Jadnanansing is an Indo-Surinamese as well as a Hindu. She is married and lives in Amsterdam.

References 

  Parlement.com biography

External links 
  House of Representatives biography

1967 births
Living people
Dutch Hindus
Dutch people of Surinamese descent
Dutch people of Indian descent
Dutch television presenters
Dutch women jurists
Labour Party (Netherlands) politicians
Members of the House of Representatives (Netherlands)
People from Leiden
Vrije Universiteit Amsterdam alumni
21st-century Dutch politicians
21st-century Dutch women politicians
Dutch women television presenters
Surinamese Hindus